The residential area known as Hales Place is part of the civil parish of Hackington, and lies to the north of the city of Canterbury in Kent, England. The residents include large numbers of students from the nearby University of Kent.

History

The area is named after a former grand house, Hales Place, itself named after the Hales family (Sir Edward Hales, 3rd Baronet and his eldest son E. Hales, esq.) who bought the land in 1675.  Hales Place replaced an older house called Place House which was situated on land originally owned by the Manwood Family.  Construction of Hales Place (the house) took place sometime between 1766 and 1769 just north of the road now called The Terrace.  The Terrace is so named as it is where the house's terrace was situated, a terrace which commanded "a most beautiful view of the metropolitan city of Kent".  The northern, western and southern boundaries of the area now known as Hales Place are largely coterminous with those of the parkland in which the house was situated.

Ownership remained in the Hales family until 1880, when it was sold to exiled Jesuits from Lyon and turned into a college.  The college was popular with the French nobility who sent their sons there to learn away from political persecution in France.  In 1928 the estate was sold and the house was demolished in the following years.  Its chapel (originally a dovecote) and the burial ground still remain, located by the Tenterden Drive layby.

Folly Farm, a grade II listed building with early 17th century origins, stands at the far east of the area.

References

External links
 

Villages in Kent